Lindale is a city in Smith County, Texas, United States. Located in East Texas, the population was 6,059 in the 2020 census. It is part of the Tyler, Texas, metropolitan statistical area.

History
The area of Smith County where Lindale sits was inhabited long before the town was founded in 1871. In the early 19th century, the Caddo Indians were the area's primary inhabitants; their artifacts can still be found along streams in the area. The area also was home to Cherokee Indians, who were forced out when the Republic of Texas was founded in 1836.

After the Civil War, Richard B. Hubbard, a former officer in the Confederate Army and owner of a large plantation on what is today a gated community called Hideaway Lake, began searching for a more convenient way to ship the produce grown on his land. Hubbard convinced railroad officials to lay track between nearby Tyler and Mineola. Hubbard's brother-in-law, Elijah Lindsey, anticipating growth around the new railroad, opened the fledgling community's first general store in 1871, and Lindale had its start; Lindsey was elected the town's first mayor a year later.

In 1996, Lindale's school board banned 32 books from its schools, including To Kill a Mockingbird, because they "conflicted with the values of the community." According to school board president John Offutt, a Baptist minister, the board's action was an attempt to make students adhere to Christian beliefs.

Geography
Lindale is located at  (32.507145, −95.408293).

According to the United States Census Bureau, the town has a total area of 4.0 square miles (10.4 km), of which 4.0 square miles (10.4 km) is land and 0.04 square mile (0.1 km) (0.50%) is water.

Demographics

As of the 2020 United States census, there were 6,059 people, 2,169 households, and 1,688 families residing in the city.

As of the census of 2000, there were 2,954 people, 1,102 households, and 794 families residing in the city. The population density was 736.2 people per square mile (284.4/km). There were 1,186 housing units at an average density of 295.6 per square mile (114.2/km). The racial makeup of the town was 88.19% White, 6.91% African American, 0.54% Native American, 0.71% Asian, 2.17% from other races, and 1.49% from two or more races. Hispanic or Latino of any race were 4.47% of the population.

There were 1,102 households, out of which 35.8% had children under the age of 18 living with them, 56.9% were married couples living together, 11.3% had a female householder with no husband present, and 27.9% were non-families. 24.9% of all households were made up of individuals, and 11.2% had someone living alone who was 65 years of age or older. The average household size was 2.56 and the average family size was 3.06.

In the city the population was spread out, with 26.9% under the age of 18, 7.8% from 18 to 24, 27.1% from 25 to 44, 20.8% from 45 to 64, and 17.3% who were 65 years of age or older. The median age was 37 years. For every 100 females, there were 84.5 males. For every 100 females age 18 and over, there were 80.5 males.

The median income for a household in the city was $33,733, and the median income for a family was $38,787. Males had a median income of $31,538 versus $21,250 for females. The per capita income for the city was $14,825. About 9.6% of families and 11.9% of the population were below the poverty line, including 16.1% of those under age 18 and 10.9% of those age 65 or over.

Notable people

 Paul Baloche, Christian singer-songwriter
 Kelli Finglass, Director of the Dallas Cowboys Cheerleaders
 Jim Granberry, Orthodonist who served as mayor of Lubbock, Texas; Republican candidate for governor in 1974
 Dallas Holm, Christian singer-songwriter originally from St. Paul Park, Minnesota
 Miranda Lambert, Grammy Award-winning country music singer-songwriter
 Pat Mahomes, MLB pitcher from 1992 to 2003, father of Kansas City Chiefs quarterback Patrick Mahomes
 Leonard Ravenhill, British evangelist and author, lived in Lindale in the 80s and ran Last Days Ministries

References

External links

 City of Lindale
 Lindale Area Chamber of Commerce

Cities in Texas
Cities in Smith County, Texas